was a  after Kaō and before Angen. This period spanned the years from April 1171 through July 1175.

Change of era
 1171 : The new era name was created to mark an event or series of events. The previous era ended and a new one commenced in Kaō 3, on the 21st day of the 4th month of 1171.

Events of the Jōan era
 1172 (Jōan 1, 3rd day of the 1st month): The emperor had attained the age of 11 years; accordingly, the hair on his head was shaved as a sign of his coming of age.
 1171 (Jōan 1, 13th day of the 1st month): The young emperor made a visit to the home of former-Emperor Go-Shirakawa, where  he first met Tiara-no Tokoku, the adopted daughter of Go-Shirakawa and the actual daughter of Taira no Kiomori. He accepted the 15-year-old girl as one of his consorts, and she moved into his palace.
 1171 (Jōan 2, 10th day of the 2nd month): Taira Kiyomori's daughter, Tokuko, becomes Emperor Takakura's his secondary empress (chūgo).
 1172 (Jōan 2, 10th month): Takakura visited the Fushimi Inari-taisha and the Yasaka Shrine.
 1172 (Jōan 2, 12th month): Matsu motofusa ceased to be regent (sesshō) and daijō-daijin; and he obtained the office of kampaku.
1173 (Jōan 3, 1st day of the 4th month): Shinran, founder of Jodo Shinshu, was born and named Matsuwakamaro
 1173 (Jōan 3, 4th month): The emperor visited the Iwashimizu Shrine and the Kamo Shrines.
 1173 (Jōan 3, 10th month): The emperor's mother, Ken-shun-mon In, founded the Saishōkō Cloister, which was consecrated at a dedication ceremony in which she was a participant.
 1174 (Jōan 4, 1st month): The emperor made visits to his father and to his mother.

Notes

References
 Brown, Delmer M. and Ichirō Ishida, eds. (1979).  Gukanshō: The Future and the Past. Berkeley: University of California Press. ;  OCLC 251325323
 Nussbaum, Louis-Frédéric and Käthe Roth. (2005).  Japan encyclopedia. Cambridge: Harvard University Press. ;  OCLC 58053128
 Titsingh, Isaac. (1834). Nihon Odai Ichiran; ou,  Annales des empereurs du Japon.  Paris: Royal Asiatic Society, Oriental Translation Fund of Great Britain and Ireland. OCLC 5850691
 Varley, H. Paul. (1980). A Chronicle of Gods and Sovereigns: Jinnō Shōtōki of Kitabatake Chikafusa. New York: Columbia University Press. ;  OCLC 6042764

External links
 National Diet Library, "The Japanese Calendar" -- historical overview plus illustrative images from library's collection

Japanese eras
1170s in Japan